Duhozanye: A Rwandan Village of Widows is a feature Norwegian documentary film for television from 2011 by director Karoline Frogner.

Norway's previous minister of justice, Knut Storberget, referred to Duhozanye in his latest book: "a film about a community of widows in Rwanda, an insightful and intense
depiction of these widows."

Summary
The Kinyarwanda word duhozanye means "let us console one another". Frogner's film documents the development of the Duhozanye Association founded by Daphrose Mukarutamu, a Tutsi who lost her husband and nine of her eleven children to the Rwandan genocide. The community was at first a group of neighbours who buried the dead and cared for twenty orphans, but grew to a network of some 4000 widows, both Hutus and Tutsis, who cared for each other and for the orphans of the genocide, running courses, starting businesses and participating in national reconciliation.

Screenings 
 Shown on Norwegian public broadcasting channel, NRK2, 24 May 2011 
 Memorium Nürnberger Prozesse, Cineroom, Bärenschanzstr. 72, 90429 Nürnberg, 10 April 2014
 The House of Literature Oslo, April 2014

References

External links 
 Official site of the widow society Duhazonye. 
 Jack David Eller's review of Duhazonye on Anthropology Review Database.
 IMDb site for Duhazonye

Rwandan genocide
Documentaries about historical events
Norwegian documentary films
2011 television films
2011 films
2011 documentary films